Verisäkeet ("Blood Verses") is the fourth full-length album by Finnish metal band Moonsorrow. It was released on 23 February 2005 through Spinefarm Records. The album comes in a full-black shining case with golden Moonsorrow logo, with the original booklet inside.  The United States release of the album, through Season of Mist, however, is packaged in a clear jewel case displaying the album's artwork.

Track listing

Personnel
 Ville Sorvali - vocals, bass
 Marko Tarvonen - drums, percussion, guitars, vocals (backing)
 Lord Eurén - keyboards, vocals (backing)
 Mitja Harvilahti - guitars, vocals (backing)
 Henri Sorvali - keyboards, guitars, mouth harp, accordion, vocals, tin whistle, recorder

Guest musicians
 Blastmor - backing vocals
 Frostheim - kantele
 Hittavainen - fiddle, jouhikko, recorder
 Jukka Varmo - vocals choir
 Janne Perttilä - vocals choir

Production
 Hunaja-Pasi Moilanen - photography
 Tero Salonen - cover art, layout
 Mika Jussila - mastering
 Ahti "Periaatteessa se on mulle aivan sama" Kortelainen - mixing
 Henri Sorvali - mixing
 Tanja Ahtila - photography

References

2005 albums
Moonsorrow albums
Season of Mist albums